"Moment of Peace" is a song by the German Gregorian chant band Gregorian featuring English singer Sarah Brightman. It was released in 2001 on Edel AG as the only single from their third studio album, Masters of Chant Chapter II (2001) of which it is the opening track. It is a Gregorian chant and new age song that was written by Amelia Brightman and Carsten Heusmann and produced by the latter and by Jan-Eric Kohrs and Michael Soltau. The Facebook page for the Gregorian band has an unpublished, multilingual version of the song uploaded by Markus Zöllner in 2014.

Track listing

Charts

References

External links
 
 
 
 
 
  (multilanguage version, original)
   (multilanguage version)
   (multilanguage version with lyrics)
 Lyrics of this song at Musixmatch (French version)

2001 singles
2001 songs
Gregorian (band) songs
Edel AG singles